Nobody, Nobody But... Juan is a Philippine comedy film released on December 25, 2009, as an entry to the 2009 Metro Manila Film Festival. The title is a take on the Wonder Girls song "Nobody".

Plot
Nobody, nobody but...Juan tells the story of a U.S.-based senior citizen named Juan (Dolphy) who lives in a senior citizens' home run by his son (Eric Quizon) and daughter-in-law (G. Toengi). The home's staff consist of a "black man" and a "chinaman", revealed as 2 gay Filipino TNTs who adopted identities to evade Immigration officers. Juan's favorite pastime is watching Wowowee on The Filipino Channel, though he does not watch the show just for entertainment's sake. Beside wanting to connect with the Philippines that he dearly misses, Juan is lonesome for his first love Aida (Gloria Romero), with whom he lost touch during the Japanese occupation of Manila. Wowowee is Juan's way of coping with homesickness and reliving the past. He usually creates alarms and scandals if he never watches Wowowee every day, in cahoots with fellow nursing home residents, Filipino or American. He also has a son, who is a womanizer and has many children out of wedlock.

When watching Wowowee is banned in the home after an incident, Juan takes drastic measures to watch his favorite TV program, from riots to hunger strikes. The last straw comes when he left the home and was caught by federal officers, also blowing the cover of the 2 assistants. He left the home and arrives in the Philippines with only his passport, plane tickets and pocket money. He arrives in Philippines, became a victim of a "fraudulent" taxi driver (Leo Martinez) who was bitten by his own schemes, meets an American who loves Wowowee too and his wife, (Chariz Solomon), evading security guards who were strict, meeting the duo of Brod Pete and Long Mejia and eventually entered the studio where the show was ongoing. In his quest, he crosses paths with his old friend Tu (Eddie Garcia) who used to be his partner in the vaudeville duo Juan Tu, that plays satiric, slapstick and prison comedy not only for rich Filipinos, but also for Japanese troops, one of them, an officer (Ya Chang), became a victim of a cream pie throwing joke. Tu now works with Lolay to embezzle money from audiences, especially foreigners by giving them "tickets" to watch Wowowee for a fee. He then meets Wowowee host (Willie Revillame) when he was dragged by the dancers, after he was tricked by Long Mejia and Brod Pete to fool the chasing guards. He tells Willie about the things that happened in his old age. After he told the story, he then sees Lolay (Pokwang) shouting his name. Lolay introduces him to Willie again and introduces Tu. The guards see Tu and chase him down. Juan and Lolay also chase Tu. Tu hides in a branch of Mang Inasal and orders a Jumbo Roasted Chicken. Juan finds him and tells him why he was being chased down. Tu confesses that they were scalpers and he knows where Aida is, but refuses to call him Tu, but Ribio. The guards and policemen eventually find Tu. Tu tells the guards that he would go to his family before going to jail.

Juan is then reunited with his long-lost love Aida, whom he found out had married Tu and Juan has a daughter. Aida was pregnant during their last show before the Americans bombed Manila, including the theater they performed. Juan decides to live permanently in Philippines, along with his daughter and oldest son, who now works as a PR man, fulfilling his promise on Tu, who was imprisoned due to estafa and Willie Revillame giving a message to Juan and to all his loyal watchers and fans.

Cast
 Dolphy as Juan
 Epi Quizon as young Juan
 Eddie Garcia  as Tu/Torribio
 Vandolph as young Tu
 Gloria Romero as Aida
 Heart Evangelista as young Aida
 Pokwang as Lolay/Lolita 
 Eugene Domingo as Julie 
 Lilia Cuntapay as Belmont Village Resident
 Mar Lopez as one of the elderly resident
 Eric Quizon as Mario
 G. Toengi as Jane
 Joseph Aldeguer as John
 Willie Revillame as himself
 Bentong as himself 
 Ya Chang as Japanese Officer
 Sahlee Quizon as Juan's daughter, Juana
 Long Mejia as himself
 Caloy Alde as himself
 Brod Pete as himself
 Chariz Solomon as TFC Subscriber
 Richard S. Cunanan as TFC Subscriber's husband
 Keanna Reeves as the gossip monger maid
 Bearwin Meily as Security Guard
 Owen Ercia as Floor Director
 Leo Martinez as taxi driver
 Lovely Abella as Wowowee dancer

References

External links
 

2009 films
Philippine comedy films
Filipino-language films
2000s Tagalog-language films
2009 comedy films
Quizzes and game shows in popular culture
Films about police officers
Films shot in Chicago
Cultural depictions of actors
Cultural depictions of Filipino people
Films directed by Eric Quizon